Biréli Lagrène (born 4 September 1966) is a French jazz guitarist who came to prominence in the 1980s for his Django Reinhardt–influenced style. He often performs in swing, jazz fusion, and post-bop styles.

Biography
Lagrène was born in Soufflenheim, Alsace, France, into a Romani family and community. His father and grandfather were guitarists, and he was raised in the Gypsy guitar tradition. He started playing at age four or five and by seven was improvising jazz in a style similar to that of Django Reinhardt, whom his father admired and wanted his sons to emulate. In 1980, while in his early teens, he recorded his first album, Routes to Django: Live at the Krokodil (Jazzpoint, 1981).

During the next few years, Lagrène toured with Al Di Meola, Paco de Lucía, and John McLaughlin, all of them guitarists, and played with Benny Carter, Benny Goodman, and Stéphane Grappelli. He joined Larry Coryell and Vic Juris in New York City for a tribute to Reinhardt in 1984 and went on tour with Coryell and Philip Catherine. He also performed with Jaco Pastorius, Stanley Clarke, the Gil Evans Orchestra, Christian Escoudé, and Charlie Haden. In 1989 he performed in a duo with Stanley Jordan.

His collaboration with Italian guitarist Giuseppe Continenza, with whom he has performed in numerous concerts and festivals, including the Pescara Jazz and the Eddie Lang Jazz Festival, began in 1998, when the two met behind the scenes of a festival and started talking about each other's musical interests.

Awards
 "Django d’Or" for "French Musician" (1993)
 "Les Victoires de la Musique" in the category of "Jazz Album" for the album Front Page (2001)
 "Les Victoires de la Musique" nominated in the category of "Jazz Album" for the album Gypsy Project and Friends (2003)
 "Django d’Or" for "French Musician" (2002)
 "Django d’Or" for "People's Choice" (2002)
 "Django d’Or" for "Balkan/Gypsy" guitar (2007)
 Medal of "Chevalier des Arts & des Lettres" of France as awarded by Frédéric Mitterrand, Minister of Culture and Communication (2012)

Discography
 Routes to Django (Antilles, 1980)
 Fifteen (Antilles, 1982)
 Down in Town (Antilles, 1983)
 Django's Music Vol. 1 with Mike Peters, Bob Wilber (Stash, 1985)
 Stuttgart Aria with Jaco Pastorius and Vladislav Sendecki (Jazzpoint, 1986)
 Bireli Lagrene and Special Guests with Larry Coryell, Miroslav Vitous (Jazzpoint, 1986)
 Inferno (Blue Note, 1987)
 Foreign Affairs (Blue Note, 1988)
 Acoustic Moments (Blue Note, 1990)
 Standards (Blue Note, 1992)
 Live at the Carnegie Hall (Jazz Point, 1993)
 Live in Marciac (Dreyfus, 1994)
 My Favorite Django (Dreyfus, 1995)
 Blue Eyes (Dreyfus, 1998)
 Duet with Sylvain Luc (Dreyfus, 1999)
 Front Page (with Dominique di Piazza and Dennis Chambers) (2001)
 Gypsy Project (Dreyfus, 2001)
 Gypsy Project & Friends (Dreyfus, 2002)
 Gipsy Project: Move (Dreyfus, 2004)
 Swing '81 (Le Chant du Monde, 2005)
 To Bi or Not to Bi (Dreyfus, 2006)
 Djangology with WDR Big Band (Dreyfus, 2006)
 Electric Side (Dreyfus, 2008)
 Gipsy Trio (Dreyfus, 2009)
 Mouvements (Universal, 2012)
 D-Stringz with Stanley Clarke, Jean-Luc Ponty (Impulse!, 2015)
 Storyteller (Naive, 2018)
 Solo Suites (2022)

Filmography
 1989  Super Guitar Trio - Live at Montreux
 2004  Bireli Lagrene & Friends:Live Jazz a Vienne (Dreyfus)
 2005  Django: A Jazz Tribute
 2005  Bireli Lagrene & Gypsy Project Live in Paris
 2006  Live in Paris (Dreyfus)
 2009  Monaco Dreyfus Night (Dreyfus)
 2017 Biréli Lagrène: Voilà!

References

External links
 Official site
 Biréli Lagrène: Voilà!

1966 births
20th-century French male musicians
20th-century guitarists
21st-century French male musicians
21st-century guitarists
Antilles Records artists
French jazz guitarists
French male guitarists
French Romani people
Gypsy jazz guitarists
Jazz fusion guitarists
Living people
French male jazz musicians
Manouche people
Romani guitarists
Swing guitarists